Arabian Shield Cooperative Insurance Company is an insurance companies within the Kingdom of Saudi Arabia.

History 
The company was established on May 19, 2007. It is located in Riyadh. It operates as a Saudi public joint stock company and is licensed by Saudi Arabian Monetary Agency (SAMA)."

Summary 
Arabian Shield Cooperative Insurance Company sells insurance products including motor, marine, property and medical insurance. In addition, the company also provides claim settlement services to its policyholders. Its customer base includes the private individuals and also the corporate clients.

2012 
Arabian Shield Cooperative Insurance Company was among the major gainers in Saudi markets gaining more than 35% during the first month of the year.

References 

Financial services companies established in 2007
Insurance companies of Saudi Arabia
Companies based in Riyadh
Saudi Arabian companies established in 2007